A Beautiful Day is a live album by American jazz pianist Andrew Hill recorded in 2002 at Birdland in New York City and released on the Palmetto label.

Reception

The Allmusic review by David R. Adler awarded the album 4 stars and stated "this remarkable live album... boasts a large ensemble, billed at Birdland and previous gigs as the Andrew Hill Sextet + 11. Despite a large regiment of horns, Hill's reflective piano figures prominently... With its wide array of available textures and juxtapositions, the big band proves an ideal vehicle for Hill's powerful, unclassifiable music".

Track listing
All compositions by Andrew Hill.

 "Divine Revelation" – 8:19  
 "Faded Beauty" – 11:28  
 "Bellezza" – 8:43  
 "5 Mo" – 6:42  
 "New Pinnochio" – 7:36  
 "J Di" – 5:50  
 "A Beautiful Day" – 11:44  
 "11/8" – 1:06 
Recorded at Birdland, New York City on January 24–26, 2002

Personnel
Andrew Hill – piano
John Savage – flute (tracks 2 & 4), alto saxophone (tracks 1, 3 & 5-8)
Marty Ehrlich – clarinet (track 4), bass clarinet (track 2), alto saxophone (tracks 1, 3 & 5-8)
Aaron Stewart, Greg Tardy – tenor saxophone
J. D. Parran – baritone saxophone
Dave Ballou, Laurie Frink, Ron Horton (tracks 1-6), Bruce Staalens  – trumpet
Mike Fahn, Joe Fielder, Charlie Gordon – trombone
Jose D'avila – tuba
Scott Colley – bass 
Nasheet Waits – drums

References

Palmetto Records live albums
Andrew Hill live albums
2002 live albums